= Millie Mayfield =

American novelist

- Born: Frederick
- Died: March 16, 1872
- Occupation: Writer

Mary Sophie Shaw Rogers Homes (c. 1830 – March 16, 1872) was an American poet and novelist who published under the name Millie Mayfield.

She was born Mary Sophie Shaw in Frederick, Maryland. She was the daughter of Thomas Shaw, cashier of the Frederick County Branch Bank of Maryland. Her uncle was the poet Dr. John Shaw (1778-1809). Her father died when she was very young, and her mother relocated the family to New Orleans, Louisiana, where she spent the rest of her life. She married Norman Rogers, but was widowed only after two years. She married Luther Homes in 1864.

Her debut novel was Carrie Harrington, or Scenes in New Orleans (1857), a morality tale about the titular young woman who was born wealthy but becomes a poor school teacher. She published Progression, or the South Defended (1860), a book-lengthy poem that was vociferous defense of the American South, invoking both evolutionary theory and Biblical precedent in an attempt to justify slavery and white supremacy. She also wrote a collection of verse, A Wreath of Rhymes (1869), and published frequently in magazines and newspapers.

Homes died on 16 March 1872.

== Bibliography ==
- Carrie Harrington, or Scenes in New Orleans (1857)
- Progression, or the South Defended (1860)
- A Wreath of Rhymes (1869)
